Muircheartach Mac Lochlainn (old spelling: Muirchertach mac Lochlainn, IPA:[ˈmˠɪɾʲəçəɾˠt̪ˠəxmˠəkˈlɔxlən̪ʲ]) was king of Tír Eoghain, and High King of Ireland from around 1156 until his death in 1166. He succeeded Toirdhealbhach Ua Conchobhair who died in 1156.

Mac Lochlainn survived an attempt by Ruaidrí Ua Conchobair to unseat him in 1159. He failed, however, to overcome the resistance of the Cenél Conaill and the Ulaid. In 1166, to attempt to achieve a diplomatic settlement with his neighbours,  Mac Lochlainn arranged a truce and took hostages from many of the families in Ulaid. In return he had given a solemn oath to the Bishop of Armagh and many other notables for his good behaviour. In violation of the oath, he had Eochaid mac Con Ulad Mac Duinn Sléibe, king of Ulaid, seized and blinded.

Mac Lochlainn's allies abandoned him almost at once, and he was reduced to a handful of followers. With sixteen of these closest associates, he was killed and his death attributed to the vengeance of Saint Patrick.

References

Ó Cróinín, Dáibhí, Early Medieval Ireland: 400–1200. Longman, London, 1995. 
"Muirchertach Mac Lochlainn and the "Circuit of Ireland"," Donnchadh O Corrain, in Seanchas: Studies in Early and Medieval Irish Archaeology, History and Literature in Honour of Francis John Byrne, pp. 238–250. Four Courts Press, Dublin, 2000.
"Mac Lochlainn, Muirchertach," volume five, Dictionary of Irish Biography ... to the Year 2002, Cambridge, 2010.

External links
CELT: Corpus of Electronic Texts at University College Cork includes the Annals of Ulster, Tigernach and the Four Masters as well as Genealogies, and various Saints' Lives. Most are translated into English, or translations are in progress

1166 deaths
Year of birth unknown
High Kings of Ireland
Kings of Ailech
12th-century Irish monarchs
People from County Donegal
Meic Lochlainn
Murdered royalty
Assassinated Irish politicians